These are the Australian Country number-one albums of 2012, per the ARIA Charts.

See also
2012 in music
List of number-one albums of 2012 (Australia)

References

2012
Australia country albums
Number-one country albums